The speckle-fronted weaver (Sporopipes frontalis) is a species of bird in the family Ploceidae.
It is found in Africa from Mauritania and Gambia in the west to Ethiopia and Tanzania in the east.
Its natural habitat is dry savanna.

Gallery

References

External links
 Speckle-fronted Weaver -  Species text in Weaver Watch.

speckle-fronted weaver
Birds of Sub-Saharan Africa
speckle-fronted weaver
Birds of East Africa
Taxonomy articles created by Polbot